The Party of Free Citizens leadership election of 2017 was held on 22 January 2017. It was held after the incumbent leader Petr Mach resigned in December 2016. Mach was reelected when he received more than 60% of votes. Voter turnout was about 50%.

Results

References

Svobodní leadership elections
Party of Free Citizens leadership election
Party of Free Citizens leadership election
Party of Free Citizens leadership election